Pedro Elawar Felix Gonçalves Borges (born 23 July 2005) is a Portuguese professional footballer who plays as a midfielder for  club Tiverton Town on loan from Exeter City.

Career
Borges joined the youth system of National League side Yeovil Town in 2021. Borges made two first team appearances for Yeovil Town in their Somerset Premier Cup victories against Bridgwater United and Larkhall Athletic.

Borges was a trialist at Exeter City in the Devon Bowl game at Axminster in January 2022. He made his senior debut for the club on 30 August 2022, after coming on as an 84th-minute substitute for Harry Kite in a 2–1 defeat to Newport County at St James Park in the group stages of the EFL Trophy. On 22 September 2022, he joined Southern League Premier Division South side Plymouth Parkway on a one-month loan, alongside teammate Harrison King. On 7 March 2023, Borges joined Southern League Premier Division South side Tiverton Town on loan.

Career statistics

References

2005 births
Living people
Portuguese footballers
Association football midfielders
Southern Football League players
Boavista F.C. players
Yeovil Town F.C. players
Exeter City F.C. players
Plymouth Parkway F.C. players
Tiverton Town F.C. players
Portuguese expatriate footballers
Portuguese expatriate sportspeople in England
Expatriate footballers in England